SV Rot-Weiß Hadamar is a German football club from the city of Hadamar in Hesse.

History 

The club was formed on 1 July 2012 through the merger of SpVgg Hadamar and SC Rot-Weiß Niederhadamar; SpVgg Hadamar was formed on 25 June 1922 through the merger of several smaller local clubs. On 25 May 1960, the gymnastics club SpVgg 06 Hadamar became part of SpVgg 1922. In addition to the footballers, there are departments for gymnastics, table tennis and running.

Through the early 2000s, the club worked to advance and won eventually promotion to the Bezirksoberliga in 2007 and then the Verbandsliga Hessen-Mitte in 2009. Two years later they advanced to the Hessenliga (V) for the first time. The second team side currently plays in the Kreisklasse B (IX).

Honours 
The club's honours:
 Verbandsliga Hessen-Mitte
 Champions: 2011
 Gruppenliga Wiesbaden
 Champions: 2009
 Bezirksliga Limburg-Weilburg
 Champions: 2007

Recent managers 
Recent managers of the club:

Recent seasons 
The recent season-by-season performance of the club:

 With the introduction of the Regionalligas in 1994 and the 3. Liga in 2008 as the new third tier, below the 2. Bundesliga, all leagues below dropped one tier. Also in 2008, a large number of football leagues in Hesse were renamed, with the Oberliga Hessen becoming the Hessenliga, the Landesliga becoming the Verbandsliga, the Bezirksoberliga becoming the Gruppenliga and the Bezirksliga becoming the Kreisoberliga.

References

External links 
 Official team site
 SpVgg Hadamar at Weltfussball.de 
 Das deutsche Fußball-Archiv  historical German domestic league tables

Football clubs in Germany
Football clubs in Hesse
Association football clubs established in 1922
1922 establishments in Germany